Jinzhou Xiaolingzi Airport is a military airport in the city of Jinzhou in Liaoning province, Northeast China. It was converted to a civil/military dual-use airport in 1993. On 10 December 2015, the new Jinzhou Bay Airport was opened and all civil flights were transferred to the new airport. Xiaolingzi Airport reverted to its original use as a military airport.

Facilities 

See also 
 List of airports in China
 List of People's Liberation Army Air Force airbases

References 

Airports in Liaoning
Airports established in 1993
Airports disestablished in 2015
Defunct airports in China
Chinese Air Force bases
Jinzhou